Hagia Sophia ( 'the Holy Wisdom';) in İznik (Nicaea) in Bursa Province, Turkey, was built as a Byzantine-era basilican church. Converted into the Orhan Mosque (Turkish: Orhan Camii) after the Ottoman conquest, it was turned into a museum in 1935. The church is now once again in service as a mosque. It is in the town centre of İznik, within the old walled area.

History 
The first church built on the site was constructed in the 4th century. It was here that the First Council of Nicaea was held in 325 A.D. The church was later rebuilt under the patronage of Emperor Justinian I in the mid-6th century. In 787, it hosted the Second Council of Nicaea, which officially ended the first period of Byzantine Iconoclasm. The Justinian-era church was destroyed by an earthquake in the 11th century and the present structure was erected around 1065 over the ruins of the older one. 

The Church of Hagia Sophia was converted into the Orhan Mosque following the fall of Nicaea to the Ottoman Turks led by Orhan Ghazi in 1331. It continued to operate as a mosque until 1935, when it was designated as a museum under the regime of Mustafa Kemal Atatürk. In November 2011 it was again converted into a mosque.

Architecture 

The current basilican structure, much of which dates to the 1065 reconstruction of the church, consists of a central nave with two side aisles. Prior to its remodelling under the Ottomans, the church had two rows of triple arcades on columns that carried a clerestory wall with five windows. Following the building's conversion to a mosque in the 14th century, it underwent renovations that included the addition of a mihrab. During the 16th-century reign of Süleyman the Magnificent, the church was restored after a disastrous fire and a minaret was constructed. The architect Mimar Sinan was also commissioned around this time to design decorations to adorn the walls of the mosque.

The restoration (or rebuilding) of such a historic church so that it could be reused as a mosque was - and remains - very controversial.  The work was carried out between 2007 and 2011.

Gallery

See also 

 Conversion of non-Islamic places of worship into mosques
 Hagia Sophia, Istanbul
 Second Council of Nicaea

References

Mosques in Turkey
Buildings of Justinian I
Byzantine church buildings in Turkey
Mosques converted from churches in the Ottoman Empire
İznik
6th-century churches
Buildings and structures in Bursa Province
Mosques converted from churches in Turkey